Vince Martell (born Vincent James Martellucci, November 11, 1945) is an American guitarist best known as the lead guitarist for Vanilla Fudge. Martell was born in the Bronx to parents who played the guitar and encouraged him to play as well. While in his teens, Martell joined the Navy, where he discovered his skills as a guitarist.

Career 
In 1963, Martell moved with his family to Florida and soon joined a band called Ricky T & The Satans Three that played in Miami blues clubs and shrimp bars in Key West. In 1966, he formed the band The Pigeons with organist Mark Stein, bassist Tim Bogert and drummer Joe Brennan. After Brennan was replaced by Carmine Appice and a record deal forced the band to change its name, the band became Vanilla Fudge.

After the breakup of Vanilla Fudge in 1970, Martell continued to perform until Vanilla Fudge reunited for another album in 1984 called Mystery. In 2000, he released his first solo CD, Endless High, followed in 2001 by a self-titled CD, Vince Martell. In 2002, he recorded a third solo CD as a tribute to Jimi Hendrix, whom Martell had befriended when Vanilla Fudge and Hendrix toured together.

In 2005, Vanilla Fudge reformed with all the original members including Martell, Mark Stein, Tim Bogert and Carmine Appice, for a tour with The Doors and Steppenwolf. In July 2006, Vanilla Fudge recorded a tribute to Led Zeppelin, working title Out Through the in Door, scheduled for release in early 2007. Martell continues to tour with Vanilla Fudge, and his own band, the Vince Martell Band with Peg Pearl (keyboards/vocals), Pete Bremy (Bass/vocals), Russ T. Blades (drums) and TigerBill Meligari (drums).

Martell is preparing for a 2008 spring/summer tour (with his own band) sharing some dates with The Shadows of Knight, with whom he has performed with at Irving Plaza (along with Mark Stein).  A new CD is also in the works.

Vince along with fellow original members Bogert, Stein and Appice opened for Deep Purple (at the band's request) on August 7, 2007 at Radio City Music Hall, continuing to tour in this lineup in early 2008.

Vince and Mark Stein appeared on The "My Music" series on PBS in March/April 2008. They are seen performing "You Keep Me Hangin' On" with backing musicians from Mark Stein's solo band. Vince and Mark Stein soon thereafter began performing around the country together as "Vanilla Fudge's Mark Stein and Vince Martell" with a new rhythm section featuring JimmyJack Tamburo from Mark Stein's band on drums, and Pete Bremy from Vince's band on bass.  This lineup toured throughout the summer of 2009.

In April 2008 Vince Martell signed with Collectables Records as a solo artist.  His Endless High album, which originally appeared in 2000 was re-released on Spectra Records.

As of 2019, Martell is back to touring with Vanilla Fudge, alongside original bandmates Mark Stein and Carmine Appice, with Pete Bremy in place of original member Tim Bogert, who officially retired from touring in 2010.

Discography
1967: Vanilla Fudge
1968: The Beat Goes On
1968: Renaissance
1969: Near the Beginning
1970: Rock & Roll
1984: Mystery
2000: Endless High
2000: Vanilla Fudge – The Return / Then And Now
2001: Vince Martell: Lead Guitarist of Vanilla Fudge
2002: Pyschedlic Cymbals
2005: Vanilla Fudge – Out Through The In Door
2009: Vince Martell – Comin' to Get Ya

References

External links
 Official Vince Martell web site
 Official Vanilla Fudge web site

American rock guitarists
American male guitarists
1945 births
Living people
Lead guitarists
People from the Bronx
Vanilla Fudge members
20th-century American guitarists
20th-century American male musicians
American people of Italian descent